Nueva Colombia is a distrito in the Cordillera Department of Paraguay, located on the road between Emboscada and San Bernardino. It stands 160 metres above sea level.

This name was adopted by the town's founders because the coffee grown in the area was similar to Colombian coffee. Nueva Colombia, in English, means New Colombia.